Kathy Jordan and Elizabeth Smylie were the defending champions, but decided not to play together. Jordan competed with Alycia Moulton but lost in the third round to Hana Mandlíková and Wendy Turnbull, while Smylie played with Catherine Tanvier but lost in the quarterfinals to Martina Navratilova and Pam Shriver.

Navratilova and Shriver defeated Mandlíková and Turnbull in the final, 6–1, 6–3 to win the ladies' doubles tennis title at the 1986 Wimbledon Championships.

Seeds

  Martina Navratilova /  Pam Shriver (champions)
  Claudia Kohde-Kilsch /  Helena Suková (second round)
  Hana Mandlíková /  Wendy Turnbull (final)
  Chris Evert Lloyd /  Anne White (second round)
  Elizabeth Smylie /  Catherine Tanvier (quarterfinals)
 n/a
  Gigi Fernández /  Robin White (third round)
  Elise Burgin /  Rosalyn Fairbank (semifinals)
 n/a
  Kathy Jordan /  Alycia Moulton (third round)
  Svetlana Parkhomenko /  Larisa Savchenko (first round)
 n/a
  Jo Durie /  Anne Hobbs (first round)
  Lori McNeil /  Catherine Suire (first round)
  Zina Garrison /  Kathy Rinaldi (third round)
  Candy Reynolds /  Anne Smith (third round)

Draw

Finals

Top half

Section 1

Section 2

Bottom half

Section 3

Section 4

References

External links

1986 Wimbledon Championships – Women's draws and results at the International Tennis Federation

Women's Doubles
Wimbledon Championship by year – Women's doubles
Wimbledon Championships
Wimbledon Championships